Elections to Liverpool City Council were held on 2 May 2002.  One third of the council was up for election and the Liberal Democrat party kept overall control of the council.

After the election, the composition of the council was
Liberal Democrat 66
Labour 26
Liberal 2
Independent 1
Others 4

Election result

Ward results

References

2002
2002 English local elections
2000s in Liverpool